WLAC is an AM radio station licensed to serve Nashville, Tennessee.

WLAC may also refer to:
 West London Aero Club
 West Los Angeles College
 World Livestock Auctioneer Championship
 WNRQ, formerly WLAC-FM, an FM radio station in Nashville, Tennessee
 WTVF, formerly WLAC-TV, a television station in Nashville, Tennessee